Samuel McKnight Reid (13 October 1939 – 9 November 2014) was a Scottish footballer who played as an inside forward. He scored the winning goal for Berwick Rangers in their 1966–67 Scottish Cup victory against Rangers, in what is rated as one of the greatest shocks in the history of Scottish football.

Reid also played for Motherwell, Falkirk, Clyde and Dumbarton. He was Bill Shankly's first signing as Liverpool manager, but never played a first-team game for the Anfield club.

His elder brother Billy and maternal uncle Tommy McKenzie were both footballers who also played for Motherwell.

References

1939 births
2014 deaths
Association football inside forwards
Scottish footballers
Scottish Football League players
Motherwell F.C. players
Liverpool F.C. players
Falkirk F.C. players
Clyde F.C. players
Scottish Junior Football Association players
Douglas Water Thistle F.C. players
Berwick Rangers F.C. players
Dumbarton F.C. players
Sportspeople from Wishaw
Footballers from North Lanarkshire